In ancient Greek religion and mythology, Hestia (meaning "hearth" or "fireside") is the virgin goddess of the hearth, the right ordering of domesticity, the family, the home, and the state. In myth, she is the firstborn child of the Titans Cronus and Rhea, and one of the Twelve Olympians.

According to ancient Greek tradition, Hestia was along with four of her five siblings devoured by her own father Cronus as an infant due to his fear of being overthrown by one of his offspring, and was only freed when her youngest brother Zeus forced their father to disgorge the children he had eaten. Cronus and the rest of the Titans were cast down, and Hestia then became one of the Olympian gods, the new rulers of the cosmos, alongside her brothers and sisters. After the establishment of the new order and in spite of her status, Hestia withdraws from prominence in mythology, with few and sparse appearances in tales. Like Athena and Artemis, Hestia elected to never marry and remain an eternal virgin goddess instead, forever tending to the hearth of Olympus.

Despite her limited mythology, Hestia remained a very important goddess in ancient Greek society. Greek custom required that as the goddess of sacrificial fire, Hestia should receive the first offering at every sacrifice in the household. In the public domain, the hearth of the prytaneum functioned as her official sanctuary. Whenever a new colony was established, a flame from Hestia's public hearth in the mother city would be carried to the new settlement. The goddess Vesta is her Roman equivalent.

Origins and etymology 
Hestia's name means "hearth, fireplace, altar", This stems from the PIE root *wes, "burn" (ultimately from  "dwell, pass the night, stay"). It thus refers to the oikos: domestic life, home, household, house, or family. Burkert states that an "early form of the temple is the hearth house; the early temples at Dreros and Prinias on Crete are of this type as indeed is the temple of Apollo at Delphi which always had its inner hestia". The Mycenaean great hall (megaron), like Homer's hall of Odysseus at Ithaca, had a central hearth. Likewise, the hearth of the later Greek prytaneum was the community and government's ritual and secular focus. Hestia's naming thus makes her a personification of the hearth and its fire, a symbol of society and family, also denoting authority and kingship.

Mythology

Origin 

Hestia is a goddess of the first Olympian generation. She is the eldest daughter of the Titans Rhea and Cronus, and sister to Demeter, Hades, Hera, Poseidon, and Zeus. Immediately after their birth, Cronus swallowed all his children (Hestia was the first who was swallowed) except the last and youngest, Zeus, who was saved by Rhea. Instead, Zeus forced Cronus to disgorge his siblings and led them in a war against their father and the other Titans. As "first to be devoured . . . and the last to be yielded up again", Hestia is thus both the eldest and youngest daughter; this mythic inversion is found in the Homeric Hymn to Aphrodite (700 BC).

Zeus assigned Hestia a duty to feed and maintain the fires of the Olympian hearth with the fatty, combustible portions of animal sacrifices to the gods. Wherever food was cooked, or an offering was burnt, she thus had her share of honor; also, in all the temples of the gods, she has a share of honor. "Among all mortals she was chief of the goddesses".

Virgin goddess 
The gods Poseidon and Apollo both (her brother and nephew respectively) fell in love with Hestia and vied for her hand in marriage. But Hestia would have neither of them, and went to Zeus instead, and swore a great oath, that she would remain a virgin for all time and never marry. In the Homeric Hymn to Aphrodite, Aphrodite is described as having "no power" over Hestia.

Status and attributes 
At Athens, "in Plato's time," notes Kenneth Dorter "there was a discrepancy in the list of the twelve chief gods, as to whether Hestia or Dionysus was included with the other eleven. The altar to them at the agora, for example, included Hestia, but the east frieze of the Parthenon had Dionysus instead." However, the hearth was imovable, and "there is no story of Hestia's "ever having been removed from her fixed abode". Burkert remarks that "Since the hearth is immovable Hestia is unable to take part even in the procession of the gods, let alone the other antics of the Olympians".

Traditionally, Hestia is absent from ancient depictions of the Gigantomachy as she is the one who must keep the home fires burning when the other gods are away. Nevertheless her possible participation in the fight against the Giants is evidenced from an inscription on the northern frieze of the Siphnian Treasury in Delphi; Brinkmann (1985) suggests that the letter tracings of one of the two goddesses right next to Hephaestus be restored as "Hestia", although other possible candidates include Demeter and Persephone, or two of the three Fates.

Her mythographic status as firstborn of Rhea and Cronus seems to justify the tradition in which a small offering is made to Hestia before any sacrifice ("Hestia comes first"), though this was not universal among the Greeks. In Odyssey 14, 432–436, the loyal swineherd Eumaeus begins the feast for his master Odysseus by plucking tufts from a boar's head and throwing them into the fire with a prayer addressed to all the powers, then carved the meat into seven equal portions: "one he set aside, lifting up a prayer to the forest nymphs and Hermes, Maia's son."

Hestia is identified with the hearth as a physical object, and the abstractions of community and domesticity, in contrast to the fire of the forge employed in blacksmithing and metalworking, the province of the god Hephaestus. Portrayals of her are rare and seldom secure. In classical Greek art, she is occasionally depicted as a woman simply and modestly cloaked in a head veil. At times, she is shown with a staff in hand or by a large fire. She sits on a plain wooden throne with a white woolen cushion and, Robert Graves declares, "did not trouble to choose an emblem for herself". Her associated sacrificial animal was a domestic pig.

Equivalence 

Her Roman equivalent is Vesta; Vesta has similar functions as a divine personification of Rome's "public", domestic, and colonial hearths, binding Romans together within a form of extended family. The similarity of names between Hestia and Vesta is, however, misleading: "The relationship hestia-histie-Vesta cannot be explained in terms of Indo-European linguistics; borrowings from a third language must also be involved," according to Walter Burkert.
Herodotus equates Hestia with the high ranking Scythian deity Tabiti. Procopius equates her with the Zoroastrian holy fire (atar) of the Sasanians in Adhur Gushnasp. To Vesta is attributed one more story not found in Greek tradition by the Roman poet Ovid in his poem Fasti, where during a feast of the gods Vesta is nearly raped in her sleep by the god Priapus, and only avoids this fate when a donkey cries out, alerting Vesta and prompting the other gods to attack Priapus in defense of the goddess. This story is an almost word-for-word repeat of the myth of Priapus and Lotis, recounted earlier in the same book, with the difference that Lotis had to transform into a lotus tree to escape Priapus, making some scholars suggest the account where Vesta supplants Lotis only exists in order to create some cult drama.

Worship 

The worship of Hestia was centered around the hearth, both domestic and civic. The hearth was essential for warmth, food preparation, and the completion of sacrificial offerings to deities. At feasts, Hestia was offered the first and last libations of wine. Pausanias writes that the Eleans sacrifice first to Hestia and then to other gods. Xenophon in Cyropaedia wrote that Cyrus the Great sacrificed first to Hestia, then to sovereign Zeus, and then to any other god that the magi suggested.

The accidental or negligent extinction of a domestic hearth fire represented a failure of domestic and religious care for the family; failure to maintain Hestia's public fire in her temple or shrine was a breach of duty to the broad community. A hearth fire might be deliberately, ritually extinguished at need; but its lighting should be accompanied by rituals of completion, purification, and renewal, comparable with the rituals and connotations of an eternal flame and of sanctuary lamps. At the level of the polis, the hearths of Greek colonies and their mother cities were allied and sanctified through Hestia's cult. Athenaeus, in the Deipnosophistae, writes that in Naucratis the people dined in the Prytaneion on the birthday of Hestia Prytanitis.

Responsibility for Hestia's domestic cult usually fell to the leading woman of the household, although sometimes to a man. Hestia's rites at the hearths of public buildings were usually led by holders of civil office; Dionysius of Halicarnassus testifies that the prytaneum of a Greek state or community was sacred to Hestia, who was served by the most powerful state officials. However, evidence of her dedicant priesthood is extremely rare. Most stems from the early Roman Imperial era, when Sparta offers several examples of women with the priestly title "Hestia"; Chalcis offers one, a daughter of the local elite. Existing civic cults to Hestia probably served as stock for the grafting of Greek ruler-cult to the Roman emperor, the Imperial family, and Rome itself. In Athens, a small seating section at the Theatre of Dionysus was reserved for priesthoods of "Hestia on the Acropolis, Livia, and Julia", and of "Hestia Romain" ("Roman Hestia", thus "The Roman Hearth" or Vesta). At Delos, a priest served "Hestia the Athenian Demos" (the people or state) "and Roma". An eminent citizen of Carian Stratoniceia described himself as a priest of Hestia and several other deities, as well as holding several civic offices. Hestia's political and civic functions are further evidenced by her very numerous privately funded dedications at civic sites, and the administrative rather than religious titles used by the lay-officials involved in her civic cults.

Shrines, temples and colonies 
Every private and public hearth was regarded as a sanctuary of the goddess, and a portion of the sacrifices, to whatever divinity they were offered, belonged to her. Aeschines, On the Embassy,
declares that "the hearth of the Prytaneum was regarded as the common hearth of the state and a statue of Hestia was there, and in the senate-house there was an altar of the goddess." A temple at Ephesus was dedicated to Hestia Boulaea - Hestia "of the senate", or boule. Pausanias reports a figurative statue of Hestia in the Athenian Prytaneum, together with one of the goddess Eirene ("Peace"). Hestia offered sanctuary from persecution to those who showed her respect and would punish those who offended her. Diodorus Siculus writes that Theramenes sought asylum directly from Hestia at the Council Chamber, leaping onto her hearth not to save himself, but in the hope that his slayers would demonstrate their impiety by killing him there".

Very few free-standing temples were dedicated to Hestia. Pausanias mentions one in Ermioni and one in Sparta, the latter having an altar but no image. Xenophon's Hellenica mentions fighting around and within Olympia's temple of Hestia, a building separate from the city's council hall and adjoining theatre: A temple to Hestia was in Andros.

Prospective founders of city-states and colonies sought approval and guidance not only of their "mother city" (represented by Hestia) but of Apollo, through one or another of his various oracles. He acted as consulting archegetes (founder) at Delphi. Among his various functions, he was patron god of colonies, architecture, constitutions and city planning. Additional patron deities might also be persuaded to support the new settlement, but without Hestia, her sacred hearth, an agora and prytaneum there could be no polis.

Hymns, odes and oaths 
Homeric Hymn 24, To Hestia, is an invocation of five lines, alluding to her role as an attendant to Apollo:

Homeric Hymn 29, To Hestia invokes Hestia and Hermes:

Bacchylides Ode 14b, For Aristoteles of Larisa:

Orphic Hymn 84 and Pindar's 11th Nemean ode are dedicated to Hestia.

In one military oath found at Acharnai, from the Sanctuary of Ares and Athena Areia, dated 350-325 BC, Hestia is called, among many others, to bear witness.

Hestia Tapestry 

The Hestia tapestry is a Byzantine tapestry, made in Egypt during the 6th century AD. It is a late and very rare representation of the goddess, whom it identifies in Greek as Hestia Polyolbos; ( "Hestia full of Blessings"). Its history and symbolism are discussed in Friedlander (1945).

Genealogy

See also 

 46 Hestia, asteroid named after the goddess
 Sacred fire of Vesta
 Vitex agnus-castus
 Zalmoxis
 Estia, daily broadsheet newspaper named after Hestia

Citations

General references 
 Burkert, Walter (1985). Greek Religion. Harvard University Press. Internet Archive.
 Diodorus Siculus, Bibliotheca Historica. Vol 1-2. Immanel Bekker. Ludwig Dindorf. Friedrich Vogel. in aedibus B. G. Teubneri. Leipzig. 1888–1890. Greek text available at the Perseus Digital Library.
 Evelyn-White, Hugh, The Homeric Hymns and Homerica with an English Translation by Hugh G. Evelyn-White. Homeric Hymns. Cambridge, Massachusetts, Harvard University Press; London, William Heinemann Ltd. 1914.
 Friedlander, Paul. (1945). Documents of Dying Paganism. University of California Press.
 Gantz, Timothy, Early Greek Myth: A Guide to Literary and Artistic Sources, Johns Hopkins University Press, 1996, Two volumes:  (Vol. 1),  (Vol. 2).
 Hesiod, Theogony, in The Homeric Hymns and Homerica with an English Translation by Hugh G. Evelyn-White, Cambridge, Massachusetts., Harvard University Press; London, William Heinemann Ltd. 1914. Online version at the Perseus Digital Library.
 Homer, The Iliad with an English Translation by A. T. Murray, Ph.D. in two volumes. Cambridge, Massachusetts., Harvard University Press; London, William Heinemann, Ltd. 1924. Online version at the Perseus Digital Library.
 Homer; The Odyssey with an English Translation by A. T. Murray, PH.D. in two volumes. Cambridge, Massachusetts., Harvard University Press; London, William Heinemann, Ltd. 1919. Online version at the Perseus Digital Library.
 Kajava, Mika. "Hestia Hearth, Goddess, and Cult", Harvard Studies in Classical Philology 102 (2004): 1–20. .
 Kerényi, Karl, The Gods of the Greeks, Thames and Hudson, London, 1951. Internet Archive.
 
 Ovid, Ovid's Fasti: With an English translation by Sir James George Frazer, London: W. Heinemann LTD; Cambridge, Massachusetts, Harvard University Press, 1959. Internet Archive.
 Pausanias, Pausanias Description of Greece with an English Translation by W.H.S. Jones, Litt.D., and H.A. Ormerod, M.A., in 4 Volumes. Cambridge, MA, Harvard University Press; London, William Heinemann Ltd. 1918. Online version at the Perseus Digital Library.
 Pindar, Odes, Diane Arnson Svarlien. 1990. Online version at the Perseus Digital Library.
 Stephenson, Hamish. (1985). The Gods of the Romans and Greeks. NYT Writer.
 West, M. L., Indo-European Poetry and Myth, Oxford University Press, 2007. . Google Books.

External links 

 HESTIA from Mythopedia
 HESTIA from The Theoi Project
 HESTIA from Greek Mythology Link

 
Domestic and hearth deities
Fire goddesses
Greek virgin goddesses
Children of Cronus
Personifications in Greek mythology
Twelve Olympians
Household deities